{{Infobox tennis biography
|name                                 = Juan Sebastián Cabal
|image                                = Cabal RG21 (17) (51377200655).jpg
|caption                              = Cabal at the 2021 French Open
|full_name                            = Juan Sebastián Cabal Valdés
|country                              = 
|residence                            = Panama City, Panama
|birth_date                           = 
|birth_place                          = Cali, Colombia
|height                               = 
|turnedpro                            =
|plays                                = Right-handed (two-handed backhand)
|coach                                = Jeff Coetzee
|careerprizemoney                     = US$4,478,646
|singlesrecord                        = 7–4 (ATP Tour and Grand Slam level, and in Davis Cup)
|singlestitles                        = 0
|highestsinglesranking                = No. 184 (28 February 2011)
|currentsinglesranking                =
|AustralianOpenresult                 = Q1 (2011, 2012)
|FrenchOpenresult                     = Q2 (2011)
|Wimbledonresult                      = Q1 (2011)
|USOpenresult                         = Q1 (2010, 2011)
|doublesrecord                        = 348–211 (ATP Tour and Grand Slam level, and in Davis Cup)
|doublestitles                        = 20
|highestdoublesranking                = No. 1 (15 July 2019)
|currentdoublesranking                = No. 10 (15 November 2021)
|AustralianOpenDoublesresult          = F (2018)
|FrenchOpenDoublesresult              = F (2011)
|WimbledonDoublesresult               = W (2019)
|USOpenDoublesresult                  = W (2019)
|OlympicsDoublesresult                = QF (2021)
| OthertournamentsDoubles             = yes
| MastersCupDoublesresult             = SF (2018, 2019)
| AustralianOpenMixedresult           = W (2017)| FrenchOpenMixedresult               = SF (2021)
| WimbledonMixedresult                = QF (2016)
| USOpenMixedresult                   = QF (2015, 2017)
| medaltemplates-expand               = yes
| medaltemplates                      =

|updated                              = 13 September 2021
}}

Juan Sebastián Cabal Valdés (born 25 April 1986) is a Colombian professional tennis player who is a former world No. 1 in doubles. He reached a career-high singles ranking of No. 184 in February 2011, but has achieved most of his success in doubles. 

Cabal is a three-time Grand Slam Champion, having won both the Wimbledon Championships and the US Open in 2019 in men's doubles, alongside compatriot Robert Farah, as well as the 2017 Australian Open in mixed doubles with Abigail Spears. He also finished runner-up in men's doubles at the 2011 French Open, partnering Eduardo Schwank, and the 2018 Australian Open with Farah.

Cabal has won 20 doubles titles on the ATP Tour, including two at Masters 1000 level, and became world No. 1 in doubles for the first time on 15 July 2019. He has spent a total of 29 weeks at the top of the doubles rankings, and he and Farah were the 2019 ATP Doubles Team of the year. Cabal has represented Colombia in the Davis Cup since 2008, as well as at the 2012, 2016 and 2020 Olympic Games.

Professional career
2011: ATP, Grand Slam debut and final, New partnership with Farah, Top 25 year-end ranking
2011 is considered as Cabal ATP and Grand Slam debut, and also considered the best year for his doubles performance at the 2011 French Open with Argentine Eduardo Schwank making history for Colombian tennis, as they defeated the No. 1 ranked pair in the semifinals, brothers Mike Bryan and Bob Bryan, 7–6(4), 6–3 and then lost the final to Daniel Nestor and Max Mirnyi.

In his second Gram Slam tournament, the 2011 Wimbledon Championships, he debuted in the first round with fellow countryman Robert Farah. They defeated the 4th seeded pair at the tournament, consisting of Pakistani Aisam Qureshi (8 in the world) and India's Rohan Bopanna (9 in the world), 2–6, 6–2 and 21–19. In the second round, they lost in three sets to the couple formed by American Michael Russell and Mikhail Kukushkin Kazakhstan, 6–4, 6–2, 6–3. He finished 2011 ranked No. 25 in the world largely thanks to his French Open run.

2013: First ATP final with Farah
In the 2013 Australian Open, he partnered again with Robert Farah and reached the quarterfinals. In 2013, they also reached the final at the ATP250 2013 Open de Nice Côte d'Azur. He finished the year ranked No. 43 in the world.

 2014: First two ATP titles, seventh final 
In 2014, Cabal and Farah reached six ATP finals, winning titles at the ATP500 2014 Rio Open and the ATP250 2014 Winston-Salem Open. They also reached the final of the ATP1000 event in Miami where they lost to Bob and Mike Bryan. He also reached a seventh final in his home country's ATP250 event, the 2014 Claro Open Colombia in Bogota with compatriot Nicolás Barrientos. He finished the year ranked No. 22 in the world.

2015: Two more ATP 250 titles, Top 20 debut
In 2015, Cabal and Farah added a further two titles winning the 2015 Brasil Open and the 2015 Geneva Open and reaching another three finals.  In February he reached a career-high ranking of No. 18 in the world. In Grand Slam events the pair struggled reaching the second round in Australia, Wimbledon and the US, and losing in the 1st round at the French Open. He finished the year ranked No. 25 in the world.

2016: Four ATP titles
2016 was the pair's most successful year in terms of the number of titles, winning four. At the 2016 Australian Open, they had their best Grand Slam result of the year, reaching the third round. In February they won two events in South America, the 2016 Argentina Open in Buenos Aires and the 2016 Rio Open. In May they reached the final in 2016 BMW Open in Munich, and then won the ATP250 event in Nice for a second time in their career. They finished the season by winning the 2016 Kremlin Cup in Moscow. Cabal finished the season ranked No. 30 in the world.

2017: Two more ATP 250 titles
In 2017, Cabal and Farah started the year by once again reaching the third round at the 2017 Australian Open. They returned to South America, defending their title at the 2017 Argentina Open and reaching the final again in Rio. They then won the ATP250 event in Munich. He then reached his first Grand Slam semifinal since 2011 at the 2017 French Open with Farah, where they lost to Michael Venus and Ryan Harrison.

2018: Australian Open final, First Masters 1000 title, Top 10 debut
In May 2018, at the 2018 Italian Open, Cabal and Farah won their first Masters 1000 title against Pablo Carreño Busta and João Sousa. With the win, Cabal reached the top 10 for the first time in his career.

2019: Two Grand Slam and Second Masters titles, World No. 1
In 2019, the most successful year for Cabal and Farah, they won their first ever grand slam men's doubles title at Wimbledon in 2019, defeating Frenchmen Nicolas Mahut and Édouard Roger-Vasselin in a thrilling 5 set match that required 4 tie-break sets; this victory helped Farah and Cabal to both ascend to world No. 1 in the week following the conclusion of the Championships.

 2020: French Open semifinal, World No. 2 
Before the COVID-19 pandemic led to the suspension of the season, Cabal competed with Jaume Munar in the 2020 Australian Open, where they lost in the second round. 

Playing with Farah once more, the pair reached the second round of the 2020 US Open. Then, they reached the semifinal of the delayed 2020 French Open, losing to Mate Pavić and Bruno Soares. Cabal ended the year as the world number 2.

 2021: Three titles, French Open semifinal, Olympics quarterfinals,  Finals qualification 
Cabal and Farah started their year by reaching the final at the 2021 Great Ocean Road Open where they reached the final, losing to Jamie Murray and Bruno Soares. Despite being seeded first, they lost in the second round of the 2021 Australian Open to Alexander Bublik and Andrey Golubev. 

They won their first title of the year in Dubai, defeating Nikola Mektić and Mate Pavić in the final. After losing in Miami and Monte Carlo, they claimed their second title of the year in Barcelona. This was followed by successive first round exits in two Masters 1000 events, Madrid and Rome.

At the 2021 French Open, Cabal and Farah were seeded second and reached the semifinals, losing to eventual champions Pierre-Hughes Herbert and Nicolas Mahut.

In the grass season, they suffered a second round loss at Queen's Club, before a semifinal appearance at Eastbourne, where they lost to Joe Salisbury and Rajeev Ram, who also defeated them in the quarterfinals at Wimbledon.

Cabal and Farah represented Colombia at the Tokyo Olympics, where they reached the quarterfinals before losing to the New Zealand pairing of Marcus Daniell and Michael Venus.

They suffered a disappointing American hard court season, losing in the first round of the US Open and Indian Wells. However, they captured their third title of the year in Vienna, avenging their earlier defeats to Salisbury and Ram by beating them in the final in straight sets. During their run, they qualified for the 2021 ATP finals.

2022: Two Masters finals

Performance timelines

DoublesCurrent through the 2022 Davis Cup.''

Mixed doubles

Major finals

Grand Slam finals

Doubles: 4 (2 titles, 2 runner-ups)

Mixed doubles: 1 (1 title)

Masters 1000 finals

Doubles: 7 (2 titles, 5 runner-ups)

ATP career finals

Doubles: 46 (20 titles, 26 runner-ups)

Notes

References

External links
 
 
 

1986 births
Living people
Sportspeople from Cali
Colombian male tennis players
Tennis players at the 2011 Pan American Games
Tennis players at the 2012 Summer Olympics
Tennis players at the 2016 Summer Olympics
Olympic tennis players of Colombia
Pan American Games gold medalists for Colombia
Pan American Games medalists in tennis
Australian Open (tennis) champions
Grand Slam (tennis) champions in mixed doubles
Grand Slam (tennis) champions in men's doubles
Wimbledon champions
US Open (tennis) champions
Medalists at the 2011 Pan American Games
Tennis players at the 2020 Summer Olympics
ATP number 1 ranked doubles tennis players
ITF World Champions